In statistics, a population is a set of similar items or events which is of interest for some question or experiment.  A statistical population can be a group of existing objects (e.g. the set of all stars within the Milky Way galaxy) or a hypothetical and potentially infinite group of objects conceived as a generalization from experience (e.g. the set of all possible hands in a game of poker). A common aim of statistical analysis is to produce information about some chosen population.

In statistical inference, a subset of the population (a statistical sample) is chosen to represent the population in a statistical analysis. Moreover, the statistical sample must be unbiased and accurately model the population (every unit of the population has an equal chance of selection). The ratio of the size of this statistical sample to the size of the population is called a sampling fraction. It is then possible to estimate the population parameters using the appropriate sample statistics.

Mean
The population mean, or population expected value, is a measure of the central tendency either of a probability distribution or of a random variable characterized by that distribution. In a discrete probability distribution of a random variable X, the mean is equal to the sum over every possible value weighted by the probability of that value; that is, it is computed by taking the product of each possible value x of X and its probability p(x), and then adding all these products together, giving . An analogous formula applies to the case of a continuous probability distribution. Not every probability distribution has a defined mean (see the Cauchy distribution for an example). Moreover, the mean can be infinite for some distributions.

For a finite population, the population mean of a property is equal to the arithmetic mean of the given property, while considering every member of the population. For example, the population mean height is equal to the sum of the heights of every individual—divided by the total number of individuals. The sample mean may differ from the population mean, especially for small samples. The law of large numbers states that the larger the size of the sample, the more likely it is that the sample mean will be close to the population mean.

Sub population
A subset of a population that shares one or more additional properties is called a sub population. For example, if the population is all Egyptian people, a sub population is all Egyptian males; if the population is all pharmacies in the world, a sub population is all pharmacies in Egypt. By contrast, a sample is a subset of a population that is not chosen to share any additional property.

Descriptive statistics may yield different results for different sub populations. For instance, a particular medicine may have different effects on different sub populations, and these effects may be obscured or dismissed if such special sub populations are not identified and examined in isolation.

Similarly, one can often estimate parameters more accurately if one separates out sub populations: the distribution of heights among people is better modeled by considering men and women as separate sub populations, for instance.

Populations consisting of sub populations can be modeled by mixture models, which combine the distributions within sub populations into an overall population distribution. Even if sub populations are well-modeled by given simple models, the overall population may be poorly fit by a given simple model – poor fit may be evidence for the existence of sub populations. For example, given two equal sub populations, both normally distributed, if they have the same standard deviation but different means, the overall distribution will exhibit low kurtosis relative to a single normal distribution – the means of the sub populations fall on the shoulders of the overall distribution. If sufficiently separated, these form a bimodal distribution; otherwise, it simply has a wide peak. Further, it will exhibit overdispersion relative to a single normal distribution with the given variation. Alternatively, given two sub populations with the same mean but different standard deviations, the overall population will exhibit high kurtosis, with a sharper peak and heavier tails (and correspondingly shallower shoulders) than a single distribution.

See also
Data collection system
Horvitz–Thompson estimator
Sample (statistics)
Sampling (statistics)
Stratum (statistics)

References

External links
Statistical Terms Made Simple

Statistical theory